Super Mario War is an open-source, platform-adventure video game and level editor first released in 2004. It is based upon gameplay elements and audiovisual media that are unofficially cloned from Nintendo's Super Mario series. The game centers on players fighting each other by one player jumping on the other player's head, or by making use of items, which can be picked up during gameplay.

Gameplay

The gameplay is somewhat simple. In various game modes, players may jump on each other's heads to defeat each other or they may use items found in the power-up boxes. The game has a variety of such configurable settings to determine when certain items spawn in the power-up boxes, the way players spawn onscreen, and more.

The game includes a campaign mode based upon an overworld similar to that of Super Mario Bros. 3. However, instead of levels, the player simply fights more of the characters featured in the game although controlled by the CPU player. The player moves onto the next level when the enemy is defeated.

History 
The original Mario War was created by Samuele Poletto in 2002, in which four Super Mario characters could fight on various levels by jumping on each other's head. The game also included a level editor. It was written in Pascal/Assembly, and was released for MS-DOS.

In 2003, Florian Hufsky, founder of the 72dpiarmy forum, started working on an open-source rewrite, which became Super Mario War. This version introduced custom characters, additional gameplay modes and map mechanics, items and power-ups. Due to its open-source nature, the game has been ported to different systems.

At the end of 2009, Florian died and the development of the game stopped.

The game has been forked by Mátyás Mustoha on GitHub in 2014.

Reception
Siliconera recommends PC users to play Super Mario War with friends. Justin Pot for MakeUseOf also advises the program is suitable for multi-player gaming, suggesting that its simplicity makes it suitable even for non-gamers. Florian Eckhardt for Kotaku called the game "pretty neat", also noting that many players have created extra maps for the game with the built-in level editor. The game has been ported to the Nintendo DS, Nintendo Wii, Nintendo Switch, PS3, Sega Dreamcast, PSP, PS Vita, Android and the original Xbox. All of the console ports are only playable via homebrew.

See also
 Jump'n Bump
 List of open-source games

References

External links
 

2006 video games
Action-adventure games
Freeware games
Windows games
MacOS games
Fangames
Linux games
Unofficial works based on Mario
Video games developed in Austria
Multiplayer and single-player video games